Yeasin Arafat may refer to:
 Yeasin Arafat (cricketer) (born 1998), Bangladeshi cricketer
 Yeasin Arafat (footballer) (born 2003), Bangladeshi footballer